Denis Lazure (October 12, 1925 – February 23, 2008) was a Canadian psychiatrist and politician. Lazure was a Member of the National Assembly of Quebec (MNA) from 1976 to 1984 and from 1989 to 1996. He is the father of actress Gabrielle Lazure.

Background

Lazure was born on October 12, 1925 in Napierville, Quebec. Lazure attended Université de Montréal and was a doctorate in medicine. He also attended the University of Pennsylvania in psychiatry as well as the University of Toronto in which he was bachelor in hospital administration.

Lazure was the founder of the infant psychiatry department of Saint-Justine Hospital in 1957. He was also the director of this hospital as well as those of Riviere-des-Prairies and Louis-Hippolyte Lafontaine all in the Montreal region. He would later be the director in 1974 of the first psychiatric hospital in Haiti. He was also a teacher at Université de Montréal and was the President of the Canadian Association of Psychiatrists.

Federal politics

Before being a Quebec MNA, Lazure ran twice for a seat in the House of Commons of Canada as a candidate for the New Democratic Party.  He finished second in a by-election in the district of Outremont—Saint-Jean in 1967 and finished third in the district of Gamelin in the 1968 federal election.

Member of the National Assembly

He was first elected to the Quebec provincial legislature in the Chambly riding as a member of the Parti Québécois in the 1976 elections and was re-elected in 1981 in Bertrand. During his first mandate he was appointed to the Cabinet by René Lévesque.  Lazure served as Minister of Social Affairs and, after his re-election, as State Minister of Social Development.

During the Parti Québécois Crisis of 1984, Lazure, who is identified with the purs et durs faction of his party, resigned from the Cabinet and from the legislature.  He eventually supported the return of Jacques Parizeau as party leader.

Political comeback

He would become a psychiatrist at the Greenfield hospital until he ran again in 1989, where he was elected in La Prairie. He was re-elected in 1994 but resigned in 1996. He returned to his professional career after. His work contribution was rewarded with an award given by the Psychiatric Doctors Association of Quebec in 2004.

Death

Lazure died on February 23, 2008.

Footnotes

See also
 Parti Québécois Crisis, 1984

1925 births
2008 deaths
Parti Québécois MNAs
Canadian psychiatrists
Quebec candidates for Member of Parliament
New Democratic Party candidates for the Canadian House of Commons
Université de Montréal alumni
University of Toronto alumni